R.J. Kost is an American politician who currently serves in the Wyoming Senate from the 19th district as a member of the Republican Party.

Career
In 2018, Kost defeated incumbent Senator R. Ray Peterson with 53.80% of the vote. He serves on the Agriculture, State and Public Lands & Water Resources, Judiciary, School Facilities, and Interstate Compact for Adult Offender Supervision committees.

Electoral history

2018

References

21st-century American politicians
Living people
People from Greybull, Wyoming
Rocky Mountain College alumni
University of Wyoming alumni
Republican Party Wyoming state senators
Year of birth missing (living people)